The Keppels is a locality containing a group of islands in the Coral Sea within the Livingstone Shire, Queensland, Australia. The largest islands are Great Keppel Island and North Keppel Island.

Education 
North Keppel Island Environmental Education Centre is an Outdoor and Environmental Education Centre at North Keppel Island.

References 

Shire of Livingstone
Localities in Queensland